Greenland Current may refer to:

West Greenland Current
East Greenland Current